Carl Lawson may refer to:
Carl Lawson (sprinter), Jamaican sprinter
Carl Lawson (American football), American football defensive end